Manon Lloyd (born 5 November 1996) is a Welsh Global Cycling Network YouTube presenter. Lloyd is a former road and track cyclist and rode professionally for UCI Women's Team  in 2018 and 2019. Representing Great Britain at international competitions, Lloyd won the bronze medal at the 2016 UEC European Track Championships in the team pursuit. Lloyd finished third in the individual competition at the 2017 Matrix Fitness Grand Prix.

On 24 December 2019, the announcement was made that Lloyd would be joining the Global Cycling Network YouTube channel as a presenter.

Biography
Lloyd is the elder of two children, raised on her family's sheep farm near Kidwelly. She attended Ysgol y Fro in the nearby village of Llangyndeyrn. Having enjoyed swimming and running as a child, Lloyd wanted to try triathlon, therefore joined the local club, Towy Riders, taking up cycling around the age of 14, at Carmarthen Park velodrome.

Major results

2014
 UEC European Junior Track Championships
1st  Team pursuit
1st  Points race
2016
 UCI Track World Cup
1st  Madison (Glasgow)
1st  Team pursuit (Glasgow)
 1st  Team pursuit, UEC European Under-23 Track Championships
 3rd  Team pursuit, UEC European Track Championships
2017
 UEC European Under-23 Track Championships
1st  Madison (with Ellie Dickinson)
3rd Points race
 1st  Team pursuit, National Track Championships
 Track Cycling Challenge 
1st Madison (with Emily Kay)
2nd Scratch race
 2nd  Team pursuit, UEC European Track Championships
3rd  Team pursuit, Round 1 (Pruszków), Track Cycling World Cup (with Neah Evans, Emily Kay and Emily Nelson)

References

External links

1996 births
Living people
Welsh female cyclists
Welsh track cyclists
Sportspeople from Carmarthen